Aagam Prasad Bantawa Rai is a Nepalese communist politician and member of the National Assembly. In 2018 he was elected in Province No. 1 for the Communist Party of Nepal (Unified Marxist–Leninist) with a four-year term.

References 

Nepal Communist Party (NCP) politicians
Members of the National Assembly (Nepal)
Communist Party of Nepal (Unified Marxist–Leninist) politicians
Year of birth missing (living people)
Living people